Russia participated in the Junior Eurovision Song Contest 2010 in Minsk, Belarus. The Russian entry was selected through a national final, organised by Russian broadcaster All-Russia State Television and Radio Company (VGTRK). The final was held on 30 May 2010. Sasha Lazin & Liza Drozd and their song "Boy and Girl" won the national final, getting 11.00% of votes.

Before Junior Eurovision

National Final 
On 27 February 2010, VGTRK announced that a national final would be held to select Russia' entry for the Junior Eurovision Song Contest 2010. A submission period for interested artists was opened and lasted until 20 April 2010. A professional jury selected eighteen artists and songs from the applicants to proceed to the televised national final.

The selected artists and songs competed at the national final which took place on 30 May 2010 at the State Kremlin Palace in Moscow, hosted by Oksana Fedorova and Oskar Kuchera. In addition to the performances from the competitors, the show featured guest performances by Tolmachevy Twins, Aleksandra Golovchenko, Katya Ryabova and Yulia Savicheva. The members of the jury were Larisa Rubalskaya, Yury Entin, Valeriya, Gennady Gokhstein and Grigory Gladkov.

At Junior Eurovision 
During the allocation draw on 14 October 2010, Russia was drawn to 7th, following Sweden and preceding Latvia. Russia placed 2nd, scoring 119 points.

Sasha Lazin & Liza Drozd were joined on stage by four backing dancers, two boys and two girls: Grigory Sergeev, Viktoria Slavina, Ekaterina Kozlova and Ivan Smidovich.

In Russia, show were broadcast on Russia-1 with commentary by Olga Shelest. The Russian spokesperson revealing the result of the Russian vote was Philipp Mazurov.

Voting

Notes

References

Junior Eurovision Song Contest
Russia
2010